is a train station in the small town of Mine, Yamaguchi Prefecture, Japan.

Lines 
West Japan Railway Company
Mine Line

Railway stations in Japan opened in 1916
Railway stations in Yamaguchi Prefecture